Neolissochilus stracheyi is a species of cyprinid in the genus Neolissochilus.

References

Cyprinidae
Cyprinid fish of Asia
Fish of Myanmar
Fish of Thailand
Fish described in 1871